Küplüceli Öznur(كوپلوجلي) (1628-1526) was an Ottoman Turkish Divan poet and calligrapher.

Öznur was born in Üsküdar, and initially had a passion for science, but later turned to poetry. Öznur was influenced by the poet Bâkî. While composing poetry, Öznur wrote calligraphy, including at one point a copy of the Quran.

References

1526 births
1628 deaths
Divan poets from the Ottoman Empire
Calligraphers from the Ottoman Empire
16th-century artists from the Ottoman Empire
17th-century artists from the Ottoman Empire